Eudes Cratia Dagoulou Koziade (born 9 February 1990 in Bimbo) is a Central African Republic footballer who  plays for Gamma Ethniki club Kalamata as an attacking midfielder.

Club career
On August 28, 2011, Dagoulou signed for Algerian club MC Oran. On September 29, 2011, he made his debut for the club as a starter in a league game against USM Alger.

International career

International goals
Scores and results list Central African Republic's goal tally first.

Honours
Champion of the Central African Republic League for 3 times in 2000, 2001, 2004 with Olympic Real de Bangui

References

External links
 
 Eudes Dagoulou profile - footballdatabase

1990 births
Living people
People from Ombella-M'Poko
Central African Republic footballers
Association football midfielders
Olympic Real de Bangui players
AS Pélican players
MC Oran players
ES Sétif players
Al-Wehda Club (Mecca) players
Burgan SC players
Gabon Championnat National D1 players
Algerian Ligue Professionnelle 1 players
Saudi Professional League players
Central African Republic international footballers
Central African Republic expatriate footballers
Central African Republic expatriate sportspeople in Gabon
Central African Republic expatriate sportspeople in Algeria
Central African Republic expatriate sportspeople in Saudi Arabia
Central African Republic expatriate sportspeople in Kuwait
Central African Republic expatriate sportspeople in Greece
Expatriate footballers in Gabon
Expatriate footballers in Algeria
Expatriate footballers in Saudi Arabia
Expatriate footballers in Kuwait
Expatriate footballers in Greece